Yevhen Yudenkov (born April 10, 1993, in Donetsk, Ukraine) is a Ukrainian male artistic gymnast and member of the national team.

Career
His first international success came in 2017 when he won silver medal in team competition at the 2017 Summer Universiade. Since then he regularly represents Ukraine at international competitions. In 2019, he received the title of Master of Sport in Ukraine.

He became European champion in team competition at the 2020 European championships in Mersin, Turkey.

In 2021, he represented Ukraine at the 2020 Summer Olympics in Tokyo, Japan.

References

External links
 

1993 births
Sportspeople from Donetsk
Living people
Ukrainian male artistic gymnasts
Universiade medalists in gymnastics
Universiade silver medalists for Ukraine
Medalists at the 2017 Summer Universiade
Gymnasts at the 2020 Summer Olympics
Olympic gymnasts of Ukraine
European champions in gymnastics
21st-century Ukrainian people